Fredric Leif Olof Andersson (born October 13, 1988) is a Swedish professional ice hockey player. He is currently playing as Captain for IF Björklöven in the HockeyAllsvenskan (Allsv).

Andersson has formerly played with Södertälje SK and Modo Hockey in the Elitserien. He has also appeared in the top tier SHL with Linköpings HC and Örebro HK.

References

External links

1988 births
Living people
IF Björklöven players
Huddinge IK players
Linköping HC players
Modo Hockey players
Örebro HK players
Södertälje SK players
Swedish ice hockey left wingers
Västerviks IK players
People from Tumba, Sweden
Sportspeople from Stockholm County